James Hubert Farmer (born September 23, 1964) is an American former professional basketball player who was drafted by the Dallas Mavericks in the first round (20th pick overall) of the 1987 NBA draft. Farmer, a 6'4" 190 lb small forward, played for the Mavericks, Utah Jazz, Seattle SuperSonics, Philadelphia 76ers, and Denver Nuggets in 5 NBA seasons. His best stint as an NBA player was during the 1990–91 season when he appeared in 25 games for the Nuggets and averaged 10.0 ppg.

Personal life
Jim is a native of Dothan, Alabama, and is a 1982 graduate of Houston Academy in Dothan. He played basketball collegiately at the University of Alabama.

Legal issues
In 2019, Farmer was one of 16 men arrested in the two-day sting operation southeast of Nashville, Tennessee. He allegedly responded to an adult escort advertisement and agreed to both meet and pay $170 to an undercover officer who identified herself as a 16-year-old girl for sex, per the report.

References

1964 births
Living people
Alabama Crimson Tide men's basketball players
American expatriate basketball people in Italy
American men's basketball players
Basketball players from Alabama
Birmingham Bandits players
Columbus Horizon players
Dallas Mavericks draft picks
Dallas Mavericks players
Denver Nuggets players
Fort Wayne Fury players
Orlando Magic expansion draft picks
Pensacola Tornados (1986–1991) players
Philadelphia 76ers players
Rapid City Thrillers players
Seattle SuperSonics players
Small forwards
Sportspeople from Dothan, Alabama
Utah Jazz players
Victoria Libertas Pallacanestro players
Yakima Sun Kings players